Why is the fourth EP by English hardcore punk band Discharge, released in 1981 on Clay Records. It reached number 1 on the UK Indie Charts in 1981. It was reissued in 2003 with 12 bonus tracks. The reissue EP is 31:52 in length.

Track listing
All tracks written by Discharge

CD reissue bonus tracks
 "Realities of War"
 "They Declare It"
 "But After the Gig"
 "Society's Victim"
 "Fight Back"
 "War's No Fairytale"
 "Always Restrictions"
 "You Take Part in Creating This System"
 "Religion Instigates"
 "Decontrol"
 "It's No T.V. Sketch"
 "Tomorrow Belongs to Us"

References

Discharge (band) EPs
1981 EPs
Albums produced by Mike "Clay" Stone